Barney and Betty Hill were an American couple who claimed they were abducted by extraterrestrials in a rural portion of the state of New Hampshire from September 19 to 20, 1961. The incident came to be called the "Hill Abduction" and the "Zeta Reticuli Incident" because the star map shown to Betty Hill could possibly be the Zeta Reticuli system according to some researchers. Their story was adapted into the best-selling 1966 book The Interrupted Journey and the 1975 television film The UFO Incident.

Most of Betty Hill's notes, tapes, and other items have been placed in the permanent collection at the University of New Hampshire, her alma mater. In July 2011, the New Hampshire Division of Historical Resources marked the site of the alleged craft's first approach with a historical marker. 

The Hills' story was widely publicized in books and movies.

Background
The Hills lived in Portsmouth, New Hampshire. Barney (1922–1969) was employed by the United States Postal Service, while Betty (née Eunice Barrett)  (1919–2004) was a social worker. Active in the local Unitarian congregation, the Hills were also members of the NAACP and community leaders, and Barney sat on a local board of the United States Commission on Civil Rights. They were an interracial couple at a time when it was particularly uncommon in the United States; Barney was black and Betty was white.

UFO encounter

According to a variety of reports given by the Hills, the alleged UFO sighting happened about 10:30 p.m. September 19, 1961. The Hills were driving back to Portsmouth from a vacation in Niagara Falls and Montreal. Just south of Lancaster, New Hampshire, Betty claimed to have observed a bright point of light in the sky that moved from below the moon and the planet Jupiter, upward to the west of the moon. While Barney navigated U.S. Route 3, Betty reasoned that she was observing a falling star, only it moved upward. Because it moved erratically and grew bigger and brighter, Betty urged Barney to stop the car for a closer look, as well as to walk their dog, Delsey. Barney stopped at a scenic picnic area just south of Twin Mountain.

Betty, looking through binoculars, observed an "odd-shaped" craft flashing multicolored lights travel across the face of the moon. Because her sister had several years earlier said she had seen a flying saucer, Betty thought it might be what she was observing. Through binoculars, Barney observed what he reasoned was a commercial airliner traveling toward Vermont on its way to Montreal. However, he soon changed his mind, because without looking as if it had turned, the craft rapidly descended in his direction. This observation caused Barney to realize, "this object that was a plane was not a plane." 

The Hills said they continued driving on the isolated road, moving very slowly through Franconia Notch in order to observe the object as it came even closer. At one point, the object passed above a restaurant and signal tower on top of Cannon Mountain and came out near the Old Man of the Mountain. The couple watched as the silent, illuminated craft moved erratically and bounced back and forth in the night sky.

About one mile south of Indian Head, they said, the object rapidly descended toward their vehicle, causing Barney to stop in the middle of the highway. It reminded Barney of a huge pancake. Carrying his pistol in his pocket, he stepped away from the vehicle and moved closer to the object. Using the binoculars, Barney claimed to have seen eight to eleven humanoid figures, who were peering out of the craft's windows, seeming to look at him. In unison, all but one figure moved to what appeared to be a panel on the rear wall of the hallway that encircled the front portion of the craft. The one remaining figure continued to look at Barney and communicated a message telling him to "stay where you are and keep looking." Barney had a recollection of observing the humanoid forms wearing glossy black uniforms and black caps. Red lights on what appeared to be bat-wing fins began to telescope out of the sides of the craft, and a long structure descended from the bottom of the craft. On Oct. 21, 1961, Barney reported to National Investigations Committee On Aerial Phenomena (NICAP) investigator Walter Webb that the "beings were somehow not human."

Immediate aftermath 
Arriving home at about dawn, the Hills stated that they had some odd sensations and impulses they could not readily explain: Betty insisted their luggage be kept near the back door rather than in the main part of the house. Their watches would never work again. Barney said that the leather strap for the binoculars was torn, though he could not recall it tearing. The toes of his best dress shoes were scraped. Barney says he was compelled to examine his genitals in the bathroom, though he found nothing unusual. They took long showers to remove possible contamination and each drew a picture of what they had observed.

Perplexed, the Hills say they tried to reconstruct the chronology of events as they witnessed the UFO and drove home. But immediately after they heard the buzzing sounds, their memories became incomplete and fragmented. After sleeping for a few hours, Betty awoke and placed the shoes and clothing she had worn during the drive into her closet, observing that the dress was torn at the hem, zipper and lining. Later, when she retrieved the items from her closet, she noted a pinkish powder on her dress. She hung the dress on her clothesline and the pink powder blew away, but the dress was irreparably damaged. She threw it away, but then changed her mind, retrieved the dress and hung it in her closet. Over the years, five laboratories have conducted chemical and forensic analyses on the dress.

There were shiny, concentric circles on their car's trunk that had not been there the previous day. Betty and Barney experimented with a compass, noting that when they moved it close to the spots, the needle would whirl rapidly. But when they moved it a few inches away from the shiny spots, it would drop down.

Initial report to the U.S. Air Force and NICAP 
Walter N. Webb, a Boston astronomer and NICAP member, met with the Hills on October 21, 1961. In a six-hour interview, the Hills related all they could remember of the UFO encounter. Barney stated that he had developed a "mental block", and that he suspected there were some portions of the event that he did not wish to remember. He described in detail all that he could remember about the craft and the appearance of the "somehow not human" figures aboard it. Webb stated that "they were telling the truth and the incident probably occurred exactly as reported except for some minor uncertainties and technicalities that must be tolerated in any such observations where human judgment is involved (e.g., exact time and length of visibility, apparent sizes of object and occupants, distance and height of object, etc.)."

Betty's dreams 
Ten days after the alleged UFO encounter, Betty began having a series of vivid dreams, which continued for five successive nights. She stated that she experienced them with a degree of detail and intensity that she had never had before. After the fifth night, they stopped and never recurred, though they occupied her thoughts during the day. When she mentioned them to Barney, he was sympathetic, but not too concerned, and the matter was dropped. Betty did not mention them to Barney again.

In November 1961 Betty began writing down the details of her dreams. In one dream, she and Barney encountered a roadblock and men who surrounded their car. She lost consciousness but struggled to regain it. Then she realized that she was being forced by two small men to walk in a forest at night, and of seeing Barney walking behind her, though when she called to him, he seemed to be in a trance or sleepwalking. The men stood about five feet to five feet four inches tall and wore matching blue uniforms, with caps similar to those worn by military cadets. They appeared nearly human, with black hair, dark eyes, prominent noses and bluish lips. Their skin was a greyish colour.

She and Barney were taken to their car, where the leader suggested that they wait to watch the craft's departure. They did so, and then resumed their drive home.

Medical help and more interviews

Missing time
Having read Webb's initial report, Jackson and Hohmann had many questions for the Hills. One of their main questions was about the length of the trip. Although the Hills had noted that they had arrived home later than anticipated (the 178-mile drive should have taken about four hours), they did not realize that they had arrived home seven hours after their departure from Colebrook. When Hohman and Jackson noted this discrepancy to the Hills, the couple had no explanation (a phenomenon ufologists call "missing time"). The Hills claimed to recall almost nothing of the 35 miles of US Route 3 between Lincoln/Indian Head and Ashland. Both claimed to recall an image of a fiery orb sitting on the ground. Betty and Barney reasoned that it must have been the moon, but Hohmann and Jackson informed them that the moon had set earlier in the evening.

The subject of hypnosis came up, and it was decided that it should be carried out in order to recover previously irretrievable memories. Barney was apprehensive, but thought it might help Betty put to rest what Barney described as "the 'nonsense' about her dreams."

Private disclosure 
On November 23, 1962, the Hills attended a meeting at the parsonage of their church, where Captain Ben H. Swett of the United States Air Force was a guest speaker. Having had an interest in hypnosis, the Hills approached Swett privately and related their strange encounter. Swett was particularly interested in the "missing time" of the Hills' account. The Hills asked if he would hypnotize them to recover their memories, but Swett declined and cautioned them against going to an amateur hypnotist, such as himself.

Simon's hypnosis sessions

Barney's sessions 
Under hypnosis (as was consistent with his conscious recall), Barney reported that the binocular strap had broken when he ran from the UFO back to his car. He recalled driving the car away from the UFO, but that afterwards he felt irresistibly compelled to pull off the road and drive into the woods. He eventually sighted six men standing in the dirt road. The car stalled and three of the men approached the car. They told Barney not to fear them. He was still anxious, however, and he reported that the leader told Barney to close his eyes. While hypnotized, Barney said, "I felt like the eyes had pushed into my eyes."

Barney described the beings as generally similar to Betty's hypnotic (not dream) recollection. The beings often stared into his eyes, said Barney, with a terrifying, mesmerizing effect. Under hypnosis, Barney said things like, "Oh, those eyes. They're there in my brain" (from his first hypnosis session) and "I was told to close my eyes because I saw two eyes coming close to mine, and I felt like the eyes had pushed into my eyes" (from his second hypnosis session) and "All I see are these eyes…. I'm not even afraid that they're not connected to a body. They're just there. They're just up close to me, pressing against my eyes."

While Betty reported a conversation with the "leader" in English, Barney said that he heard them speaking in a mumbling language he did not understand. Betty also mentioned this detail. The few times they communicated with him, Barney said it seemed to be "thought transference"; at that time, he was unfamiliar with the word "telepathy".

Betty's sessions 
Under hypnosis, Betty's account was similar to her five dreams about the UFO abduction, with some notable differences, mainly pertaining to her capture and release. Also, the technology on the craft was different, the short men differed significantly in physical appearance and the sequential order of the abduction differed. Barney's and Betty's memories in hypnotic regression were, however, consistent with one another.

Simon's conclusions 
When the series of hypnosis sessions were complete, Simon wrote an article about the Hills for the journal Psychiatric Opinion, explaining his conclusion that the case was a singular psychological aberration.

Post-hypnosis publicity and Betty's death
The Hills went back to their regular lives. They were willing to discuss the alleged UFO encounter with friends, family and the occasional UFO researcher, but the Hills apparently made no effort to seek publicity.

On October 25, 1965, a front page story in the Boston Traveller asked "UFO Chiller: Did THEY Seize Couple?" Reporter John H. Luttrell of the Traveller had allegedly been given an audio tape recording of the lecture the Hills had made in Quincy Center in late 1963. Luttrell learned that the Hills had undergone hypnosis with Simon; he also obtained notes from confidential interviews the Hills had given to UFO investigators. On October 26, United Press International (UPI) picked up Luttrell's story, and the Hills earned international attention.

In 1966 writer John G. Fuller secured the cooperation of the Hills and Simon and wrote the book "The Interrupted Journey" (see below) about the case. The book included a copy of Betty's sketch of the "star map." The book was a quick success and went through several printings.

Barney died of a cerebral hemorrhage on February 25, 1969, at age 46, after which Betty went on to become a celebrity in the UFO community. 

She died of cancer on October 17, 2004, at age 85, never having remarried.

Analyzing the star map 

In 1968 Marjorie Fish of Oak Harbor, Ohio, read Fuller's book, Interrupted Journey. Fish was an elementary school teacher and amateur astronomer. Intrigued by the "star map," Fish wondered if it might be "deciphered" to determine which star system the UFO came from. Assuming that one of the fifteen stars on the map must represent Earth's Sun, Fish constructed a three-dimensional model of nearby Sun-like stars (i.e., stars deemed to have characteristics that could support life such as that found on Earth) using thread and beads, basing stellar distances on those published in the 1969 Gliese Star Catalogue. Studying thousands of vantage points over several years, the only one that seemed to match the Hill map was from the viewpoint of the double star system of Zeta Reticuli (about 39 light-years from Earth).

Fish sent her analysis to Webb. Agreeing with her conclusions, Webb sent the map to Terence Dickinson, editor of the magazine Astronomy. Dickinson did not endorse Fish and Webb's conclusions, but for the first time in the journal's history, Astronomy invited comments and debate on a UFO report, starting with an opening article in the December 1974 issue.
 For about a year afterward, the opinions page of Astronomy carried arguments for and against Fish's star map. Notable was an argument made by Carl Sagan and Steven Soter, arguing that the "star map" was little more than a random alignment of chance points. In an episode of Cosmos in 1980, Sagan demonstrated that without the lines drawn in the maps, the Hill map bore no resemblance to the real-life map. In contrast, those more favorable to the map, such as David Saunders, a statistician who had been on the Condon UFO study, disagreed. Saunders claimed that a match among sixteen stars of the specific spectral type among the thousand stars nearest the Sun is “at least 1,000 to 1 against."

In the early 1990s the European Hipparcos ("high precision parallax collecting satellite") mission, which measured the distances to more than a hundred thousand stars around the Sun more accurately than ever before, showed that some of the stars in Fish's interpretation of the map were in fact much farther away than previously thought. Other research revealed that some stars counted by Fish as likely to host life would have had to be excluded by her own criteria, while some other stars which had been discounted by Fish have been recognised as potential abodes for life. Results such as these led Fish herself to reject her hypothesis in a public statement.

Interrupted Journey 
The 1966 publication of Interrupted Journey, by John G. Fuller, details much of the Hills' claims. Excerpts of the book were published in Look magazine.

Captured! The Betty and Barney Hill UFO Experience by Betty Hill's niece Kathleen Marden further explored Fuller's themes along with scientist Stanton T. Friedman. Marden, who sat on the board of the Mutual UFO Network (MUFON) for 10 years, knew Betty well and had spoken with her at great length about the encounter.

Rebutting the Hills
Psychiatrists later suggested that the supposed abduction was a hallucination brought on by the stress of being an interracial couple in early 1960s United States. 

Jim Macdonald, a resident of the area in which the Hills claimed to have been abducted, has produced a detailed analysis of their journey which concludes that the episode was provoked by their misperceiving an aircraft warning beacon on Cannon Mountain as a UFO. Macdonald notes that from the road the Hills took, the beacon appears and disappears at exactly the same time the Hills describe the UFO as appearing and disappearing. The remainder of the experience is ascribed to stress, sleep deprivation, and false memories "recovered" under hypnosis. After reading Macdonald's recreation, UFO expert Robert Sheaffer writes that the Hills are the "poster children" for not driving when sleep deprived. 

Skeptical Inquirer columnist Robert Sheaffer wrote:
"I was present at the National UFO Conference in New York City in 1980, at which Betty presented some of the UFO photos she had taken. She showed what must have been far more than 200 slides, mostly of blips, blurs, and blobs against a dark background. These were supposed to be UFOs coming in close, chasing her car, landing, etc. ... After her talk had exceeded about twice its allotted time, Betty was literally jeered off the stage by what had been at first a sympathetic audience. This incident, witnessed by many of UFOlogy's leaders and top activists, removed any lingering doubts about Betty's credibility — she had none. In 1995, Betty Hill wrote a self-published book, A Common Sense Approach to UFOs. It is filled with delusional stories, such as seeing entire squadrons of UFOs in flight and a truck levitating above the freeway."

Sheaffer later wrote that as late as 1977, Betty Hill would go on UFO vigils at least three times a week. One evening she was joined by UFO enthusiast John Oswald. When asked about Betty's continuing UFO observations, Oswald stated, "She is not really seeing UFOs, but she is calling them that." On the night they went out together, "Mrs. Hill was unable to distinguish between a landed UFO and a streetlight." In a later interview, Sheaffer recounts that Betty Hill wrote, "UFOs are a new science … and our science cannot explain them."

Robert Sheaffer released 48 pages of archived documents relating to Betty and Barney Hill, Benjamin Simon and Philip J. Klass on the Internet on December 23, 2015.

Similarity to The Outer Limits

In his 1990 article "Entirely Unpredisposed," Martin Kottmeyer suggested that Barney's memories revealed under hypnosis might have been influenced by an episode of the science fiction television show The Outer Limits titled "The Bellero Shield", which was broadcast about two weeks before Barney's first hypnotic session. The episode featured an extraterrestrial with large eyes who says, "In all the universes, in all the unities beyond the universes, all who have eyes have eyes that speak." The report from the regression featured a scenario that was in some respects similar to the television show. In part, Kottmeyer wrote:

Wraparound eyes are an extreme rarity in science fiction films. I know of only one instance. They appeared on the alien of an episode of an old TV series The Outer Limits titled "The Bellero Shield." A person familiar with Barney's sketch in The Interrupted Journey and the sketch done in collaboration with the artist David Baker will find a "frisson" of "déjà vu" creeping up his spine when seeing this episode. The resemblance is much abetted by an absence of ears, hair, and nose on both aliens. Could it be by chance? Consider this: Barney first described and drew the wraparound eyes during the hypnosis session dated 22 February 1964. "The Bellero Shield" was first broadcast on 10 February 1964. Only twelve days separate the two instances. If the identification is admitted, the commonness of wraparound eyes in the abduction literature falls to cultural forces.

When a different researcher asked Betty about The Outer Limits, she insisted she had "never heard of it." Kottmeyer also pointed out that some motifs in the Hills' account were present in the 1953 film, Invaders from Mars.

In popular culture 
Barney Hill was on an episode of To Tell the Truth, episode airdate December 12, 1966.

The couple was portrayed by James Earl Jones and Estelle Parsons in the 1975 television film adapted by S. Lee Pogostin, The UFO Incident. 

In 2015 it was reported that Gotham/Principal would adapt Stanton Friedman's 2007 book about the case, Captured! The Betty and Barney Hill UFO Experience: The True Story of the World’s First Documented Alien Abduction, into a film. and a TV series 

In 2018 the story formed the basis of the "Dinner Party" virtual reality exhibit at the travelling art show Wonderspaces.

Betty and Barney Hill have been the topic of many podcasts over the years. Non-fiction television programs that have discussed the encounter include:
 The 12th episode of Carl Sagan's miniseries Cosmos, "Encyclopedia Galactica."
 An episode of the Travel Channel series Mysteries at the Museum 

Fictional depictions include:
 Details of the Hills' case were used in The X-Files episode "Jose Chung's "From Outer Space"."
 The couple was portrayed by Basil Wallace and Lee Garlington in the 1996 television series Dark Skies.
 The graphic novel Saucer Country (2012) by Paul Cornell
 Elements of the Hill abduction were used in the American Horror Story season Asylum and Death Valley. 
 The incident is referenced in the episode "Alien Experiencer Expo" of the television series People of Earth, as part of a bonding experience between an interracial couple of alien abductees. 
 The ninth episode of the 2019 History Channel television series "Project Blue Book," entitled "Abduction," is based on the Betty and Barney Hill UFO incident.
 The song "Bug in the Net", the tenth track on the Swedish death metal band Hypocrisy's 2021 album "Worship", centers on the Hills' abduction story.

See also 
 List of reported UFO sightings
 Serpo
 Zeta Reticuli in fiction

References

Book sources 
 Clark, Jerome. "The UFO Book: Encyclopedia of the Extraterrestrial." Visible Ink, 1998. 
 Friedman, Stanton, & Kathleen Marden. "Captured! The Betty and Barney Hill UFO Experience." Franklin Lakes, NJ: New Page Books, 2007.  
 Fuller, John G. (1975). "Interrupted Journey." (mass market paperback edition) Berkley Publishing Group. .
 Hopkins, Budd. "Hypnosis and the Investigation of UFO Abduction Claims," pp. 215–40 in "UFOs and Abductions: Challenging the Borders of Knowledge," David M. Jacobs, ed. University Press of Kansas, 2000. )
 Pearse, Steve. "Set Your Phaser to Stun." Xlibris, 2011. . (Kindle edition)
 Roth, Christopher F. "Ufology as Anthropology: Race, Extraterrestrials, and the Occult."  In "E.T. Culture: Anthropology in Outerspaces," Debbora Battaglia, ed. Durham, NC: Duke University Press, 2005. 
 Webb, Walter. "A Dramatic UFO Encounter in the White Mountains, NH." Confidential report to NICAP. October 26, 1961.

External links 
 Hills' papers at the University of New Hampshire Library
 CSICOP article linking aliens' appearance to "Outer Limits" episode.
 Betty & Barney Hill – Testimony by Ben H. Swett
 UFO website of Kathleen Marden, the Hills' niece

Contactees
Alien abduction reports
People from Portsmouth, New Hampshire
Married couples
UFO sightings in the United States
1961 in New Hampshire
African-American history of New Hampshire
September 1961 events in the United States